Rosedale is a town in McClain County, Oklahoma, United States.  The population was 66 at the 2000 census.

Geography

Rosedale is located along State Highway 59.

Demographics

At the 2000 census there were 66 people, 26 households, and 19 families living in the town. There were 31 housing units at an average density of 401.7 per square mile (149.6/km2). The racial makeup of the town was 86.36% White, 6.06% from other races, and 7.58% from two or more races. Hispanic or Latino of any race were 21.21%.

Of the 26 households 38.5% had children under the age of 18 living with them, 61.5% were married couples living together, 11.5% had a female householder with no husband present, and 26.9% were non-families. 26.9% of households were one person and 15.4% were one person aged 65 or older. The average household size was 2.54 and the average family size was 3.11.

The age distribution was 31.8% under the age of 18, 6.1% from 18 to 24, 30.3% from 25 to 44, 13.6% from 45 to 64, and 18.2% 65 or older. The median age was 29 years. For every 100 females, there were 106.3 males. For every 100 females age 18 and over, there were 114.3 males.

The median household income was $11,875 and the median family income  was $15,938. Males had a median income of $0 versus $16,750 for females. The per capita income for the town was $7,285. There were 53.3% of families and 53.3% of the population living below the poverty line, including 77.3% of under eighteens and none of those over 64.

Notable people
 Jimmy Wakely Country-Western singer and actor, and was raised in Rosedale.
 Willis Whitfield, physicist and inventor of the "Cleanroom" used in the manufacture of IC chips, and was born in Rosedale.

References

Towns in McClain County, Oklahoma
Towns in Oklahoma